Dirk Brouwer (1899 in Alkmaar – 1941 in Overveen) was a Dutch architect. His father was a concierge at  a local technical school.

After three years of studies Dirk Brouwer learned from various architects and attended a course for Higher Architectural Education in Amsterdam.
 
His buildings were designed according to the Amsterdam School and he cooperated with Willem Marinus Dudok, a notable assertor of Modernism, thus Brouwer's style was influenced. In 1938 he designed the backside and possibly also the dome light of the Bijenkorf department store in Amsterdam. He also built the HEMA store in Heerlen.

In World War II he joined the resistance and the editors of the illegal magazine Vrij Nederland. He was therefore executed by German troops in the dunes near Overveen in 1941.

1899 births
1941 deaths
Dutch architects
People from Alkmaar
Dutch resistance members
People executed by Nazi Germany by firing squad
Resistance members killed by Nazi Germany
Dutch people executed by Nazi Germany
Deaths by firearm in the Netherlands